The Norweilemil were an indigenous Australian people of the Northern Territory.

Country
They were also attested around Stuart Point.

Practices
Baldwin Spencer classifies them with many other contiguous tribes in that area:-
To the same group of tribes belong, apparently, the Koarnbut, Quiradara, Norweilemil, Punuurlu, Kumertuo, Geimbio, Malanji, and, possibly, the Larakia. These, together with the Iwaldji, Kakadu, and the Melville and Bathurst Islanders, form a group of tribes sharply marked off, not only by the absence of class organisation, but by the fact that their initiation ceremonies are distinguished by the absence of both circumcision and subincision.

He also adds that, like the others, they do not appear to have used bullroarers.

Alternative names
 Lemil. (?)
 Noalanji.

Notes

Citations

Sources

Aboriginal peoples of the Northern Territory